Rock Wood is a  biological Site of Special Scientific Interest north of Uckfield in East Sussex.

This ancient wood has several different types of broadleaved woodland, a stream which cuts through a steep sided valley and a small waterfall. The valley has a moist and mild climate which provides a suitable habitat for mosses and liverworts which are uncommon in south-east England.

References

Sites of Special Scientific Interest in East Sussex
Maresfield